NZPP may refer to:
Kapiti Coast Airport
National Zoological Park Police
New Zealand Public Party